Travis Tranel (born September 12, 1985) is a Wisconsin dairy farmer, Republican politician and legislator.

Background 
Born in Dubuque, Iowa, Tranel graduated from Wahlert Catholic High School of Dubuque in 2004, and Loras College in 2007, and operates his own dairy farm.

Legislative career 
He was elected as a member of the Wisconsin State Assembly in 2010. After winning his primary election by 3,024 to 2,519 votes, he unseated incumbent Democrat Phil Garthwaite, with 10,384 votes to 7,844 for Garthwaite. He is a member of the Knights of Columbus, and the National Rifle Association.

In 2012, he was re-elected, with 14,232 votes to 11,961 for Democrat Carol Beals, president of the AFSCME union local for employees of the University of Wisconsin-Platteville.

In 2014, he won re-election again with 12,240 votes as Democrat Chad Henneman had only 7,689 votes.

In 2016, Tranel was elected to a fourth term in the state assembly with 15,056 votes beating Democrat Jesse Bennett.

In 2018, Tranel was elected to a fifth term in the state assembly with 12,858 votes beating Democratic challenger Mike Mooney, who received 8,968 votes.

In 2020, Tranel was elected to a sixth term in the state assembly with 16,741 votes beating Democrat Shaun Murphy-Lopez, who received 11,528 votes.

In 2022, Tranel was elected to a seventh term in the state assembly with 14,626 votes beating Democrat Lynne Parrott, who received 8,724 votes.

References

Farmers from Wisconsin
Politicians from Dubuque, Iowa
People from Cuba City, Wisconsin
Loras College alumni
Republican Party members of the Wisconsin State Assembly
1985 births
Living people
21st-century American politicians